Agama dodomae is a species of lizard in the family Agamidae. It is a small lizard found in Tanzania.

References

Agama (genus)
Reptiles of Tanzania
Endemic fauna of Tanzania
Reptiles described in 1923
Taxa named by Arthur Loveridge